The BWF World Junior Ranking is the official ranking of the Badminton World Federation, introduced since January 2011. Players must be under 19 years of age to be eligible in the World Junior Rankings. Players will be removed from the World Junior Ranking once they have reached 19 years of age on 1 January. In doubles, players will be ranked as individuals and not as pairs.

Points system
Badminton Asia Confederation may select up to two tournaments to upgrade to European Junior Championships level and up to three tournaments to the upgraded Asian and European Tournaments level as stated in World Junior ranking table below. Badminton Europe can select up to three tournaments to upgrade to the upgraded Asian and European International Tournaments level. Points are awarded according to the following table:

Year-end number one players

Number one ranked players

The following is a list of players who have achieved the number one position since 29 December 2011 (current number one players are marked in bold):

Last update: 10 January 2023

NOTE: BWF has frozen the World Rankings from 17 March until 11 August 2020 due to the COVID-19 pandemic. The rankings updated occasionally, not every weeks.

Men's singles

Women's singles

Men's doubles

Women's doubles

Mixed doubles

References

Ranking
Badminton records and statistics
Sports world rankings
Youth badminton